Juan Ignacio Duato Bárcia, also known as Nacho Duato (born 8 January 1957) is a Spanish modern ballet dancer and choreographer. Since 2014, Duato is artistic director of the Berlin State Ballet.

Career 

Nacho Duato studied at the Rambert School of London, Maurice Béjart's Rudra School in Brussels and Alvin Ailey American Dance Theater in New York City.

He started his dancing career in Stockholm's Cullberg Ballet and one year later he joined, Nederlands Dans Theater, with artistic director Jiří Kylián and remained with the company for ten years. In 1983 he choreographed the Jardí tancat ( Shut Garden in Catalan) to music composed by Maria del Mar Bonet. They were awarded with the first prize in the Internationaler Choreographischer Wettbewerb, Köln. In 1988, Duato was appointed NDT resident choreographer together with Hans van Manen and Jiří Kylián.

From 1990 to 2011, Nacho Duato was the artistic director at Compania Nacional de Danza. In 2011 to 2014, he was leading the ballet company of the Mikhailovsky Theatre in Russia. In 2014, Nacho Duato became general and artistic director at the Berlin State Ballet. In 2016, Michael Mueller, Mayor of Berlin, announced that the city would not extend Duato's contract with the company when it expired in 2019. Sasha Waltz and Johannes Ohman succeeded him as joint artistic directors of the Berlin State Ballet.
Duato returns to his previous post in Saint Petersburg as artistic director of the Mikhailovsky ballet company.

Prizes and awards 
 1983: Internationaler Choreographischer Wettbewerb, Köln, First prize for Jardí tancat.
 1987: VSCD Gouden Dansprijs for his dancing skilfulness
 1995: The grade of Chevalier dans l'Ordre des Arts et des Lettres which is awarded annually by the French Embassy in Spain.
 1998: Gold Medal for Merit in the Fine Arts awarded by the Spanish Council.
 2000: Prix Benois de la Danse awarded by 'the 'International Dance Association at the Stuttgart Opera, for his choreography Multiplicity. Forms of Silence and Emptiness (Multiplicidad, formas de silencio y vacío).
 2003: Spanish National Dance Award (Premio Nacional de Danza'') for choreography

References

External links 
 Página personal de Nacho Duato  
 Archive film of Nacho Duato's Gnawa performed in 2010 at Jacob's Pillow
 Archive film of Nacho Duato's Arenal performed in 2004 at Jacob's Pillow
Archive film of David Hallberg performing in Nacho Duato's Kaburias in 2012 at Jacob’s Pillow
 Nacho Duato's page at Staatsballett Berlin in German(archived version from 2014)

1957 births
Living people
People from Valencia
Spanish male ballet dancers
Spanish choreographers
Ballet choreographers
Prix Benois de la Danse winners
Spanish LGBT people
LGBT dancers
LGBT choreographers